Benny van der Reijden (born July 1, 1994) is a former professional basketball player, who played three seasons for Donar as a development player. Van der Reijden was part of the 2014 DBL championship team and won 2 NBB Cups with Donar.

References

External links
FIBA Profile
DBL Profile

1994 births
Living people
Centers (basketball)
Donar (basketball club) players
Dutch Basketball League players
Dutch men's basketball players
People from Zoetermeer
Sportspeople from South Holland
21st-century Dutch people